Family policy in Hungary refers to the government measures that have been passed to increase Hungary's birth rate and to stop the decline of the country's population. Hungary has family policy that seeks to subsidize childcare for new parents.

History

Hungary's population has been declining since 1980, when the country's population peaked at 10.7 million, and it is the country in Europe whose population has been shrinking for the longest time. The main cause is that women on average do not have at least 2.1 or more children, which is needed to keep the population stable (see TFR). No governments has changes the trend since 1980, but there were several visible alterations during the last decades. It fell from 2.17 in 1977 to 1.23 in 2011. The Bokros package, the financial crisis of 2007–2008, and the European debt crisis all accelerated the downward trend.

Current situation
The Second Orbán Government made saving the nation from the demographic abyss a key aspect and therefore has introduced generous breaks for large families and greatly increased social benefits for all families. Those with three or more children pay virtually no taxes. In just a couple years, Hungary went from being one of the countries spending the least on families in the OECD to being one of those spending the most. In 2015, it was almost 4% of GDP.

Annual number of live births

Fertility rate

Support in salaries

The Orbán Government kept the earlier existed family allowance and beside that introduced the family tax benefit.

Marriage support
The government introduced the discount for first married couples: newly-married couples receive together 5,000 HUF per month for 24 months after marriage.

Housing support
Since 2015, the CSOK (családi otthonteremtési kedvezmény) can be required by married couples for used or newly-built houses and apartments if they promise to have one, two, three or four children. The size of support depends on the number of children that the couple plans to have. At least one of the parents must be under 40 years old. They also have to meet the following requirements: unpunished life and 180 days social security payment before the request (in case of one or two children) or 2 years social security payment (in case of 3 or more children). The children - who could be of blood or adoptee - have to live with the parents to fulfill the criteria. They can get CSOK as a fixed sum of money or as preferential mortgage rates on housing. The sum can be calculated as follows:

{| class="sortable wikitable"
! style="width:5%;"| Number of children
! style="width:10%;"| Buying new apartment or house Area
! style="width:10%;"| Buying new apartment or house Preferential mortgage rate
! style="width:10%;"| Buying used apartment or house Area
! style="width:10%;"| Buying used apartment or house Preferential mortgage rate
|-
| 1 child
| Minimum 40 m2 apartment or 70 m2 house
| 600,000 HUF
| Minimum 40 m2 apartment or house
| 600,000 HUF
|-
| 2 children
| Minimum 50 m2 apartment or 80 m2 house
| 2,600,000 HUF
| Minimum 50 m2 apartment or house
| 1,430,000 HUF
|-
| 3 children
| Minimum 60 m2 apartment or 90 m2 house
| 10,000,000 HUF + 10,000,000 HUF fix payment
| Minimum 60 m2 apartment or house
| 2,200,000 HUF
|-
| 4 or more children
| Minimum 60 m2 apartment or 90 m2 house
| 10,000,000 HUF + 10,000,000 HUF fix payment
| Minimum 70 m2 apartment or house
| 2,750,000 HUF
|}

Families can also refund most of their taxes up to 5 million HUF that they pay for house and building material purchases. Finally, they need to pay only 5% in VAT.

Maternity benefit
The amount of the maternity benefit is equal to the 225% of the minimal pension at the time of birth of the child (64,125 HUF in 2017); in case of twins, it is 300% (85,500 HUF in 2017). It is a one-off support.

Child care allowance
The child care allowance is paid monthly if the child has reached the age of 2. The amount is equal to 70% of either the mother's or father's salary up 140% of the current minimum wage, which was 138,000 HUF in 2018.

Free or reduced cost services for children
Several measures were introduced since 2010 that made services free or cheaper for families with children.

Vaccinations against the following diseases are free and obligatory in Hungary: tuberculosis, diphtheria, tetanus, pertussis, poliomyelitis, haemophilus influenzae, measles, mumps, rubella, hepatitis, streptococcus pneumoniae. The government made vaccinations for other diseases free, chicken pox, both types of meningitis and rotavirus, in 2018.

Children in the first nine years get free textbooks in school since 2017. Those in higher years but living in disadvantaged conditions, suffering from long-term illness, receiving child protection benefit, or living in a large family with three or more children are also entitled to free textbooks. However, the government plans to provide free textbooks for every pupils and students until the final exam.

Children who live in disadvantaged conditions, suffer from long-term illness, get child protection benefit, or live in a large family with three or more children get also free or half-priced meals in nurseries, kindergartens and schools. Meanwhile, others get them on reduced prices.

Those younger than 20 who will get a European driving license in Category B (motor vehicles) may both take a course on the KRESZ (similar to the British Highway Code) for free and try the test for the first time at no charge.

For those getting a successful language exam at the B2 or the C1 level, the price of the exam is refunded by the state if the examinee is under 35 years old.

Children may use public transport free if they are accompanied by an adult and do not attend school yet. Pupils, students and undergraduates may use public transport at half price by showing their student card.

Support for parents
Parents of one child have 2 days extra paid vacation. Parents of two children get 4 days. Parents of three or more children receive seven extra paid vacation days, compared to the average Hungarian.

Support for grandmothers
The Women 40 program makes it possible for women who have worked 40 years to retire to get more time to spend with grandchildren or with their own parents.

Support of Hungarians outside of Hungary

Maternity benefit (outside of Hungary)
Maternity benefit is a one-off support to Hungarian mothers living abroad and amounts to 64,125 HUF per child. In the case of twins, the amount is 85,500 HUF together.

Baby bond (outside of Hungary)
Every Hungarian parent living outside of Hungary may have a 42,500 HUF account per child. The money stays in the bank and bears interest until the child reach the age of 18, When the person may get the final amount.

See also
Demographics of Hungary

References

Further reading 

 

Demographics of Hungary
Hungary
Politics of Hungary